"You Met Your Match" is a song written by Stevie Wonder, Lula Mae Hardaway, and Don Hunter that was released by Wonder on his 1968 album For Once in My Life. It was the first song Wonder produced in the studio.
"You Mey Your Match" was released as a single where it reached No. 35 on the Billboard Hot 100 and No. 2 on the Billboard R&B chart.

Background
Cash Box said that it has a "pounding rhythm and a vocal performance that scours the emotions," calling the single an "exciting drive side."  Billboard called it a "pulsating rocker" and a "blockbuster." Wonder biographer Steve Lodder described the song as being "based around blues changes" but said that it "lacks an 'earworm' hook of a melodic line."
"You Met Your Match" was one of the first songs to use a clavinet in a popular music recording.

Chart performance

References

1968 songs
1968 singles
Stevie Wonder songs
Songs written by Stevie Wonder
Songs written by Lula Mae Hardaway
Song recordings produced by Stevie Wonder
Tamla Records singles